Aghrab Beni Awad is a village in the county of Bada'an, Province of Ibb, in the Republic of Yemen. Aghrab is famous for its agriculture and high school, Shohatee High School.

References 

Populated places in Ibb Governorate